Waltz in A-flat major, Op. 69, No. 1, is a waltz composed by Frédéric Chopin in 1835. It was posthumously published by his friend Julian Fontana in 1855, six years after the composer’s death, together with the earlier composed Waltz Op. 69, No. 2. It is also called "The Farewell Waltz" or "Valse de l'adieu".

History
The waltz was originally written as a farewell piece to Maria Wodzińska, to whom Chopin is said to have been engaged. This autographed copy Pour Mlle Marie, given to her in Dresden, Germany, in September 1835 is now lost. Another autographed version of the piece he dedicated in 1837 to Eliza Peruzzi. A third autograph, held by the Bibliothèque Nationalen de Paris, Chopin dedicated 1842 to Mademoiselle Charlotte de Rothschild. Various copies of this waltz exist, among them one presented as the posthumous edition of Julian Fontana, but it has not been substantiated by any known autograph.

Music

The waltz is in A-flat major, with a time signature of 3/4. The tempo is marked at tempo di valse, or a waltz tempo. The beginning theme, marked con espressione, is melancholic and nostalgic, and reaches a small high point with a fast flourish. The second part is marked sempre delicatissimo, or con anima in other versions. It is somewhat more cheerful than the previous theme, but soon gives way to the same first theme. After a second rendition of the first theme is a third theme, marked as dolce, the most playful theme. It leads to another theme with a series of ascending double-stops. This fourth theme is marked poco a poco crescendo, with other editions adding ed appassionato. This leads back to the third, playful theme, and returns to the beginning with a da capo al fin.

References

External links 
 
 Hear a performance of the piece at The Chopin Project site

Waltzes by Frédéric Chopin
1835 compositions
Compositions in A-flat major
Compositions by Frédéric Chopin published posthumously
Music with dedications